Three ships of the Royal Navy have been named HMS Ramsey

 HMS Ramsey - originally Isle of Man Steam Packet Company's passenger ferry The Ramsey, commissioned in 1914 as an armed boarding steamer, and sunk in 1915.
 HMS Ramsey (G60) - originally USS Meade (DD-274), a  transferred from the US Navy in 1940.
  -  is the tenth , launched in 1999 and decommissioned in 2021.

References

Royal Navy ship names